George Karl Wentzlaff, whose stage name was George "Foghorn" Winslow (May 3, 1946  June 13, 2015), was an American child actor of the 1950s known for his stentorian voice and deadpan demeanor. He appeared in several films, opposite such stars as Marilyn Monroe, Cary Grant, Ginger Rogers, Dean Martin, and Jerry Lewis. In the late 1950s, he retired from acting.

Career
Nicknamed "Foghorn" for his raspy voice as a slender child with dark blond hair and deep blue eyes, Wentzlaff, a Los Angeles native, broke into the entertainment business on Art Linkletter's family-oriented radio program, People are Funny. Asked his name by Linkletter, the youngster said: "George Wentzlaff, but I'd rather be Casey Jones", with a delivery that cracked up Linkletter and the audience and led to about 20 subsequent appearances on the show.

Actor Cary Grant, who heard the show and was impressed with Wentzlaff's unusual voice and comedy instincts, introduced him to director Norman Taurog, leading to his roles in Grant's films, Room for One More (1952) and Monkey Business (also 1952), which co-stars Ginger Rogers and Marilyn Monroe. Next up was Gentlemen Prefer Blondes (1953), in which Wentzlaff — playing Henry Spofford III, Monroe's young admirer — stole scenes from the actress, including his line about her possessing a "certain animal magnetism". In the comedy Mister Scoutmaster (1953), he traded barbs with Clifton Webb, and he had a small role in the musical comedy Artists and Models (1955), with Dean Martin, Jerry Lewis, Dorothy Malone and newcomer Shirley MacLaine in what blogger Aurora called Wentzlaff's "last 'good' movie."

He also appeared in television episodes of The Adventures of Ozzie and Harriet, Blondie and Dear Phoebe. Wentzlaff's final screen appearance came in the feature film, Wild Heritage (1958), cast as 'Talbot Breslin', son to film's lead, Maureen O'Sullivan.

Personal life and death
Retiring from show business at age 12, Wentzlaff finished school, served in the Navy during the Vietnam War, moved to Camp Meeker in the late 1970s and retired from the Postal Service a few years before his death. Wentzlaff died of a heart attack June 13, 2015, at age 69. His body was found by a friend the following day.

A memorial service was held in Petaluma, California, in July 2015, followed by burial with military honors at the Sacramento Valley National Cemetery.

Filmography

References

Bibliography
 Holmstrom, John. The Moving Picture Boy: An International Encyclopaedia from 1895 to 1995, Norwich, Michael Russell, 1996, pp. 257–258.
 Best, Marc. Those Endearing Young Charms: Child Performers of the Screen. South Brunswick and New York: Barnes & Co., 1971, pp. 265–269.

External links
 
New York Times obituary

1946 births
2015 deaths
People from Sonoma County, California
Male actors from Los Angeles
American male child actors
United States Navy sailors